Liptovský Ondrej is a village and municipality in Liptovský Mikuláš District in the Žilina Region of northern Slovakia.

History 
In historical records the village was first mentioned in 1332.

Geography 
The municipality lies at an altitude of 690 metres and covers an area of 4.689 km2. It has a population of about 570 people.

External links 
 https://web.archive.org/web/20071217080336/http://www.statistics.sk/mosmis/eng/run.html

Villages and municipalities in Liptovský Mikuláš District